David or Dave Logan may refer to:

 Dave Logan (American football) (born 1954), former NFL wide receiver
 David Logan (American football) (1956–1999), former NFL defensive lineman
 Dave Logan (ice hockey) (born 1954), former NHL defenseman
 David Logan (basketball) (born 1982), American/naturalized Polish Euroleague player
 David Logan (British politician) (1871–1964), British Member of Parliament, 1929–1964
 David Logan (Oregon politician) (1824–1874), member of the Oregon legislature and constitutional convention
 David Logan (chemist) (born 1956), Northern Irish professor of theoretical chemistry
 Dave Logan (writer) (born 1968), American author and professor
 David Dale Logan (1879–1956), Scottish physician, soldier and medical author
 David Logan (footballer) (born 1963), English footballer

See also
David Loggan